Colin Andrew Sturgess (born 15 December 1968) is an English former road and track cyclist, who last worked as a directeur sportif for UCI Continental team . On the track, he won a gold and a bronze medal in the individual pursuit at the world championships in 1989 and 1991. He competed at the 1988 Summer Olympics in the 4 km individual pursuit and finished in fourth place. On the road, he won the British National Road Race Championships in 1990. In 2010 he was inducted to the British Cycling Hall of Fame.

Early life 
Sturgess was born in Ossett, Wakefield, England, the only child of Alan and Ann Sturgess, both from London. When he was six, his family moved to Johannesburg, South Africa. The family subsequently returned to the UK, settling in Leicester, in order to help Sturgess make progress in his cycling career. He took a silver medal in the individual pursuit at the 1986 Commonwealth Games in Edinburgh, finishing ahead of Chris Boardman.

Professional career 
Sturgess turned professional after the 1988 Olympics. Among his professional teams was ADR, where he was a team-mate of Greg LeMond. He became celebrated for his showmanship on the bike; rather than maintaining an even pace as was the conventional tactic, he would hold back until the final lap and kick hard. In his World Championship win in 1989, where he trailed Dean Woods by over a second going into the last lap, he employed this tactic and crossed the finish line 1.66 seconds ahead of his rival.

He won the British National Individual Pursuit Championships professional event three times in 1989, 1990 and 1991.

Disillusioned with the sport, in part due to drug-taking in the peloton, he had interrupted his career around 1993, when he graduated in English literature from Loughborough University and moved with his partner to Sydney, Australia. In Australia, he resumed competing, while working as a sports journal editor, and later returned to England. He finally retired in 2000, after winning a silver medal at the 1998 Commonwealth Games as part of the England team pursuit squad alongside a young Bradley Wiggins, and worked as a wine maker and wine educator near Sydney, winning national awards for his work. According to Sturgess, the immediate reason for his retirement was a dispute with British Cycling's management regarding money, however he later identified the falling out as a symptom of a then-undiagnosed case of bipolar disorder, which contributed to the break-up of his two marriages, problems with alcoholism, and a suicide attempt.

Post-cycling career 
Sturgess returned to the UK in 2013, and has since involved himself with coaching. In 2014 he returned to competition, winning the League of Veteran Racing Cyclists time trial championship in September of that year. In May 2016 he joined the Metaltek–Kuota team in a dual role as a rider in veterans' races and also as the team's directeur sportif.

References

External links

1968 births
Living people
Olympic cyclists of Great Britain
Cyclists at the 1988 Summer Olympics
People from Ossett
UCI Track Cycling World Champions (men)
Sportspeople from Yorkshire
Commonwealth Games silver medallists for England
English male cyclists
Cyclists at the 1998 Commonwealth Games
Commonwealth Games medallists in cycling
Cyclists at the 1986 Commonwealth Games
People with bipolar disorder
Sportspeople from Leicester
English track cyclists
Medallists at the 1986 Commonwealth Games
Medallists at the 1998 Commonwealth Games